Rawshan Ara Bachchu (17 December 1932 – 3 December 2019) was a Bangladeshi activist. She took part in Bengali Language Movement in 1952. She was awarded Anannya Top Ten Awards in 2009.

Early life
Bachchu's family originated from Kulaura in Moulvibazar District. She was a student of Brojomohun College. In 1947, at the initiative of the university students and Tamaddun Majlish, she along with 7 or 8 other students formed the State Language Action Council.

Language movement
Bachchu got involved in the politics of Gonotantrik Pragotishil Chhatra Front (Democratic Progressive Student Front) in 1950 after getting admitted into the University of Dhaka. She argued in favor of women's participation in politics in a radio program in April 1950. She took part in the meeting held in Amtola at the University of Dhaka on 30 January 1952 to protest Prime Minister Khawaja Nazimuddin's declaration to make Urdu the sole language of Pakistan on 27 January.

Death 
Bachchu died on 3 December 2019.

References

1932 births
2019 deaths
People from Kulaura Upazila
University of Dhaka alumni
Bengali language movement activists
Bangladeshi women activists